Savera is a 1958 Indian Hindi-language film directed by Satyen Bose starring Ashok Kumar, Meena Kumari in lead roles. Music director Sailesh Mukherjee gave the music of the film.

Plot
Kundan (Ashok Kumar) is a medical student who is falsely implicated in a murder charge and fails to complete his degree. His neighbor and childhood friend Shanti (Meena Kumari) who Kundan grew up with was married to Kundan at the behest of her mother but they got separated after Kundan took the path of crime. Eventually, Kundan takes the job of a taxi driver and befriends a bunch of criminals. On a trip, he meets with a so called Swami Poornananda (Bipin Gupta) who also is also involved in criminal activities, immediately they befriend. By the end of their train trip they meet with an accident, injuring Swami. Kundan rescues him and takes him to a nearby ashram where Kundan disguises himself as Swami and keeps the injured Swami in his room. Here Kundan meets Shanti who also works in the ashram and identifies him as her husband from a cut in his hand. Shanti helps Kundan in starting afresh and they live happily ever after.

Cast
 Ashok Kumar as Kundan
 Meena Kumari as Shanti
 Bipin Gupta as Swami Purnananda
 Leela Mishra
 Keshto Mukherjee
 Bhagwan Sinha
 Kammo
 Samson

Crew
Director – Satyen Bose
Producer – Ruby Sen (Basu Chitra Mandir)
Dialogues – Govind Moonis
Screenplay – Satyen Bose
Cinematography	– Madan Sinha
Music – Sailesh Mukherjee
Lyrics – Shailendra, Prem Dhawan
Editing – Dulal Dutta
Art Direction – Biren Naag
Playback Singers – Manna Dey, Lata Mangeshkar, Geeta Dutt

Soundtrack
The film had seven songs in it. The music of the film was composed by Sailesh Mukherjee. Shailendra and Prem Dhawan wrote the lyrics.

References

External links
 

1958 films
1950s Hindi-language films